Decades is an American digital broadcast television network owned by Weigel Broadcasting. The network, which is mainly carried on the digital subchannels of television stations, primarily airs classic television sitcoms from the 1950s through the early 1990s.

Through its ownership by Weigel, Decades is a sister network to MeTV, which focuses on classic television series from the 1950s to the 1990s and carries some programming from former Decades corporate cousin CBS Media Ventures. As the network has access to theatrical films and television series remastered for high-definition television and widescreen presentation, the network is carried in 480i widescreen.

Since fall 2019, Decades is carried on Fox-owned stations in 12 markets as part of a multi-year agreement with Fox Television Stations, after switching from CBS-owned stations.

History
On October 21, 2014, CBS Corporation and Weigel Broadcasting announced the launch of Decades, with plans to debut the network in 2015. Through its part-ownership by CBS Corporation, Decades announced that owned-and-operated stations of the CBS television network would serve as its initial charter network affiliates.

The network was the first national multicasting venture by CBS News and Stations. The group did not carry subchannels on any of its television stations prior to 2013. And at the time of the Decades announcement, only three of its stations even maintained subchannels (CBS O&Os WCBS-TV in New York City and KYW-TV in Philadelphia carried rolling news channels under the "CBS Plus" brand on their respective secondary subchannels, while independent station KTXA in Dallas-Fort Worth, Texas carried MeTV on its second subchannel). In addition, CBS Television Distribution had already maintained a content distribution agreement with Weigel Broadcasting's classic television network MeTV, which sourced much of its programming from that library.

On January 13, 2015, Weigel Broadcasting confirmed that its Milwaukee CBS affiliate WDJT-TV would carry the network on its fourth digital subchannel. It would replace the digital news service TouchVision.

Decades officially launched at 7:00 a.m. Eastern Time Zone on May 25, 2015, with the series premiere of Through the Decades as its inaugural telecast. At the time, the network was available in over 45% of all American households with a television set.

Times for the programming are televised across all six time zones. For example, a show that begins at 8 PM Eastern Time, begins at 5 PM Pacific Time.

On March 27, 2023, Decades will be re-branded as Catchy Comedy. It will focus on primarily classic sitcoms and sketch comedy variety shows weekdays with comedy marathons on weekends.

Programming

Early days
Decades relies primarily on programming from the extensive content library owned by CBS Television Distribution, which includes the pre-2006 Paramount Television library – which CBS had acquired as a result of absorbing Paramount's syndication unit in 2006 through its split from Viacom into a separate company (CBS and Viacom re-merged to form ViacomCBS in 2019) – along with series from Desilu Productions, Bing Crosby Productions, Don Fedderson Productions, QM Productions, Spelling Television and Republic Pictures Television. Decades also carries series and movies from NBCUniversal, Warner Bros., Disney (20th Century Studios), Sony Pictures, Paramount Pictures, Metro-Goldwyn-Mayer, Lionsgate, Sonar Entertainment, the Peter Rodgers Organization, Shout! Factory, The Carsey-Werner Company and the public domain.

In an early effort to stand out from other "retro-TV" multicast services (such as MeTV and Antenna TV), the Monday through Friday schedule initially featured a block of programming based on a daily theme, with interstitial programs to highlight the theme. Each six-hour block of programming was repeated four times a day and typically included a feature film, episodes of theme related TV programs, and biographical programs featuring celebrities, actors and actresses, musicians, athletes, and public figures of interest. The theme blocks were bookended with Through the Decades, an hour-long program hosted and narrated by Bill Kurtis (who formerly served as a presenter for Chicago CBS O&O WBBM-TV and CBS News) that explores the events and news from a particular day or period in history, using archival footage that CBS owns via services such as CBS News and CBS Television Distribution's syndicated newsmagazine program Entertainment Tonight.

The network's Saturday and Sunday schedules feature marathon of classic television series. Beginning on Saturday at 12:00 p.m. (ET), forty-two consecutive hours are devoted to a particular series, which is usually sourced from either the CBS Television Distribution library of shows or a show Weigel Broadcasting has a contract to carry (such as one of the shows it broadcasts on MeTV).

Airings of The Dick Cavett Show were added to the schedule February 1, 2016 within the daily themed block, as appropriate. Episodes from Cavett's late-night ABC talk show from 1969 to 1974 as well as his later interview series on PBS, USA, and CNBC were all made available for airing.

On November 1, 2016, a major change was made to the programming lineup, with the daily programming block reduced to two airings daily (one from mid-morning to mid-afternoon, the other in overnight) as the 2:00 p.m. to midnight (ET) time period was converted to a "daily binge" with a different show airing each day. During the month of November, a different "cop show" was aired each weekday.

A further shift in direction from the original channel concept came on December 5, 2016, when the network added two daily airings of the NBC series Rowan & Martin's Laugh-In, the first breaking the daily binge in half at 6:00 p.m. (ET) and the same show repeating at the conclusion of the binge time block.

Present
From 2017 onward, the theme and binge programming on weekdays was stopped altogether and the network became mostly sitcom focused, featuring the "Television Across the Decades" block, where comedies from the 1950s through the 1980s air weekdays from mid-morning into early evening, and late evenings through the overnight hours featuring the "Smart Comedy" block – highlighted by classic sitcoms such as The Dick Van Dyke Show, Cheers, Taxi, The Honeymooners, and The Abbott and Costello Show.

Though the bulk of the lineup is now primarily sitcoms, there are deviations – most notably in prime time – which features the classic variety program The Ed Sullivan Show, Through the Decades (both also airing weekday mornings), and The Dick Cavett Show. Also, the weekend binge marathons continue, with a single series (regardless of genre) airing for 42 hours straight on Saturdays and Sundays.

Decades fulfills their FCC obligations by airing E/I programming Saturday mornings from 9 a.m. until noon (ET).

Through the Decades 
Through the Decades, hosted by Bill Kurtis, is a retrospective-type show on the American TV channel Decades. Each day's edition of the show features events that happened on that date in history.

The show debuted in September 2016. As of the March 27, 2023 schedule, the show is no longer being shown, when it is re-branded to Catchy Comedy.

Affiliates
, Decades has current or pending affiliation agreements with 35 television stations covering at least 44% of the United States. Weigel Broadcasting handles the responsibility of affiliate distribution to stations outside the core CBS O&O group.

Decades is offered to stations on a barter basis, in which the network and the local affiliate will share the responsibility of selling advertising inventory and split the allocated hourly commercial time. CBS affiliates and their owners hold the right of first refusal to carry the network in their local market, before it is offered to other network-affiliated stations. The network is also available on local cable television providers (most likely through their digital cable tiers, as is the case with most multicast networks) and other multichannel television in the United States at the discretion of the affiliate's parent station.

CBS Television Stations initially planned to launch Decades on all 16 CBS owned-and-operated stations (including two that operate as satellite stations of Minneapolis O&O WCCO-TV). Not all of the CBS Television Stations outlets were announced to carry Decades initially, as CW owned-and-operated stations in markets where CBS Corporation does not own a CBS Television Stations (such as WTOG and KSTW) were originally excluded from its initial list of affiliates. The standalone CW O&Os were later added as charter stations by late April 2015. In the Chicago market, where CBS Television Stations and Weigel Broadcasting each own television stations, the network was carried on CBS O&O WBBM-TV, instead of one of Weigel's three stations in that market – WCIU-TV, WWME-CD and WMEU-CD. (A similar situation existed in that market with Movies!, in which WPWR-TV – owned by Weigel's partner in that network, Fox Television Stations – carries the network in lieu of any of Weigel's outlets.) Conversely, Weigel-owned WBME-CD carries the network in the Milwaukee market. WMYS-LD in South Bend, Indiana is the other Weigel-owned station to carry the network.

On January 9, 2015, Decades reached its first affiliation agreement with a station outside the core CBS Television Stations, through a deal with Media General for its Green Bay, Wisconsin ABC affiliate WBAY-TV (which was previously affiliated with CBS from 1953 to 1992). WBAY planned to carry the marathon blocks on its third subchannel as a replacement for the Live Well Network. However, on January 13, as a result of Walt Disney Television's decision to temporarily continue Live Well Network's national operations, WBAY announced that its 2.3 subchannel would not switch to Decades until after LWN's new March 2015 shutdown date. It eventually picked up Ion Television as part of a group deal with WBAY owner Media General to carry the network in markets without an Ion station. When the E.W. Scripps Co. purchased the Ion Television network in 2020, Ion moved to a newly-assigned digital subchannel, 26.5, on competitor WGBA-TV. A few days later, WBAY-TV started airing Decades on channel 2.6.

On September 3, 2018, Decades was replaced on CBS-owned stations with Start TV, a new Weigel-owned diginet focusing on crime dramas with female leads. Weigel maintained its commitment to Decades, with the company's owned-and-operated stations taking over in Los Angeles and Chicago. When it began airing on Fox-owned television stations, Decades moved to KTTV in Los Angeles. In Chicago, Decades continues to be seen on Weigel-owned WMEU-CD and WCIU-TV.

On April 19, 2022, Decades began airing on the Frndly TV live streaming service.

List of current affiliates

Former affiliates

References

External links
  (Decades)
  (Catchy Comedy)

Television networks in the United States
Decades (TV network)
Classic television networks
Nostalgia television in the United States
English-language television stations in the United States
Weigel Broadcasting
Television channels and stations established in 2015
2015 establishments in the United States